Lebed means swan is several Slavic languages and may refer to:
Places
Lebed (river) in Siberia in eastern Russia
Lebed, Bulgaria, a village in Kardzhali Province, Bulgaria
Lebed Point in Antarctica, named after Lebed, Bulgaria

Aircraft
Lebed class LCAC, A Soviet hovercraft
Lebed XI, a Russian military reconnaissance aircraft
Lebed XII, a Russian military reconnaissance aircraft

Other
Lebed (surname)

See also